Poecilasthena balioloma is a moth of the family Geometridae first described by Alfred Jefferis Turner in 1907. It is found in Australia, including Tasmania.

References

External links
Australian Faunal Directory

Moths of Australia
Moths described in 1907
Poecilasthena